Apollonos Hydreium (Plin. vi. 26; It. Anton.) or Apollinopolis or Apollonopolis, was an ancient city of Egypt that stood upon the high road from Coptos, in the Thebaid, to Berenice on the Red Sea, and was a watering station for the caravans in their transit between those cities.

References

Cities in ancient Egypt
Former populated places in Egypt